Marc Platt (born 1953) is a British novelist and playwright. He is best known for his work with the BBC science fiction television series Doctor Who.

Career
After studying catering at a technical college, Platt worked first for Trust House Forte, and then in administration for the BBC. After multiple attempts to work on the series, he wrote the 1989 Doctor Who serial Ghost Light based on two proposals, one of which later became the novel Lungbarrow. That novel was greatly anticipated by fans as it was the culmination of the so-called "Cartmel Masterplan", revealing details of the Doctor's background and family. 

After the original series' cancellation, Platt wrote multiple tie-in novels for Virgin Publishing, and later would become a regular writer for Big Finish Productions. Among his most famous productions was the audio Doctor Who drama Spare Parts, which told the origin of the Cybermen. The story was later the inspiration for the 2006 Doctor Who television story "Rise of the Cybermen"/"The Age of Steel", written by Tom MacRae, for which Platt received a thanks in the end credits and a fee.

Credits

Television
Ghost Light

Big Finish

Doctor Who
Loups-Garoux
Spare Parts
Valhalla
The Skull of Sobek
Time Reef
Paper Cuts
An Earthly Child
The Cradle of the Snake
Relative Dimensions
The Silver Turk
The Butcher of Brisbane
Night of the Stormcrow
Eldrad Must Die!
The Doctor's Tale
Planet of the Rani
Doctor Who: Doom Coalition: The Galileo Trap
Doctor Who: Doom Coalition: The Gift
The Behemoth

Doctor Who: The Fourth Doctor Adventures
The Skin of the Sleek
The Thief Who Stole Time

Philip Hinchcliffe Presents
The Ghosts of Gralstead (with Philip Hinchcliffe)
The Devil's Armada (with Philip Hinchcliffe)
The Genesis Chamber (with Philip Hinchcliffe)

Doctor Who: The Lost Stories
Doctor Who: The Lost Stories Point of Entry (with Barbara Clegg)
Doctor Who: The Lost Stories: Thin Ice
Doctor Who: The Lost Stories: The Children of Seth (with Christopher Bailey)

Companion Chronicles
Doctor Who – The Companion Chronicles: Frostfire
Doctor Who – The Companion Chronicles: Mother Russia
Doctor Who – The Companion Chronicles: The Doll of Death
Doctor Who – The Companion Chronicles: The Three Companions
Doctor Who – The Companion Chronicles: Quinnis
Doctor Who – The Companion Chronicles: The Flames of Cadiz
Doctor Who – The Companion Chronicles: The Beginning

Doctor Who Unbound
Auld Mortality
A Storm of Angels

Jago & Litefoot
Jago and Litefoot: The Case of the Gluttonous Guru

Blake's 7
Blake's 7: Traitor
Blake's 7: The Early Years: Flag & Flame
Blake's 7: The Liberator Chronicles: The Sea of Iron
Blake's 7: The Classic Audio Adventures: Drones

Dan Dare
Dan Dare: Marooned on Mercury

Timeslip
The War That Never Was

Big Finish Classics
The Wonderful Wizard of Oz
The Time Machine

Noise Monster audio play
Space 1889: The Siege of Alclyon

Novels
Doctor Who: Ghost Light novelisation
Doctor Who: Battlefield novelisation
Doctor Who: Cat's Cradle: Time's Crucible
Doctor Who: Downtime novelisation 
Doctor Who: Lungbarrow

Comics
Doctor Who (in Doctor Who Magazine No. 192, 1992)

References

External links

Marc Platt biography at On Target

1953 births
British science fiction writers
Living people
Place of birth missing (living people)
Writers of Doctor Who novels
20th-century British novelists